Hilda Kean (born August 1949) is a British historian who specialises in public and cultural history, and in particular the cultural history of animals. She is former Dean and Director of Public History at Ruskin College, Oxford, and an Honorary Research Fellow there. Kean is a visiting professor of History at the University of Greenwich and an adjunct professor at the Centre for Australian Public History at the University of Technology Sydney. 

She is the author of a number of books, including Animal Rights: Political and Social Change in Britain since 1800 (1998), and People and their Pasts: Public History Today (2009, with Paul Ashton).

Works
Books
 (2017) The Great Cat and Dog Massacre
 (2013) Reader in Public History, Routledge, ed with Paul Martin
 (2009) People and their Pasts: Public History Today, Palgrave Macmillan (ed with Paul Ashton)
 (2004) London Stories: Personal Lives, Public Histories, Rivers Oram Press
 (2000) Seeing History: Public History in Britain Now, Francis Boutle, ed with Paul Martin, Sally J. Morgan
 (1999) Ruskin College: Contesting Knowledge, Dissenting Politics, Lawrence and Wishart, ed with Geoff Andrews, Jane Thompson
 (1998) Animal Rights: Political and Social Change in Britain since 1800, Reaktion Books
 (1990) Deeds not Words: The Lives of Suffragette Teachers, Pluto Press
 (1990) Challenging the State? The Socialist and Feminist Educational Experience, Falmer

Selected papers
 (2011) "Commemorating Animals: Glorifying Humans?  Remembering and Forgetting animals in War Memorials," eds Maggie Andrews, Charles Bagot–Jewitt, Nigel Hunt, Lest we Forget. Remembrance and Commemoration, History Press, pp. 60–70
 (2011) "English Labour movement festivals and the past: commemorating defeat and creating martyrs," in eds Laurajane Smith, Gary Campbell & Paul Shackel, Cultural Heritage and the Working Class Heritage, Labour and the Working Classes, Routledge
 (2011) "Traces and Representations: Animal Pasts in London's present," The London Journal
 (2010) "People, Historians and Public History: De -mystifying the Process of History Making," Public Historian, vol. 32, no. 3, August, pp. 25–38
 (2009) "Balto, the Alaskan dog and his statue in New York’s Central Park : animal representation and national heritage," International Journal of Heritage Studies, vol. 15, no. 5, pp. 413–430
 (2008) "Personal and Public Histories: issues in the presentation of the past," in eds Brian Graham and Peter Howard, The Ashgate Research Companion to Heritage and Identity, Ashgate, pp. 55–69 
 (2007) "The moment of Greyfriars Bobby: the changing cultural position of animals 1800 – 1920," in ed Kathleen Kete, A Cultural History of Animals in the Age of Empire 1800 – 1920, vol. 5, Berg, pp. 25–46
 (2005) "Public History & Popular Memory. Issues in the commemoration of the British militant suffrage movement," Women’s History Review, vol. 14 nos. 3 & 4, pp. 581–604
 (2004) "Public history and Raphael Samuel: a forgotten radical pedagogy?" Public History Review vol. 11, Professional Historians Association, New South Wales, Australia, pp. 51–62
 (2003) "An exploration of the sculptures of Greyfriars Bobby, Edinburgh, Scotland  and the old brown dog in Battersea, South London, England, Society and Animals, Journal of Human-Animal Studies, vol. 11, no. 4, 2003, pp. 353-73.
 (2003) "Making History in Bethnal Green: different stories of nineteenth century silk weavers," with Bruce Wheeler, History Workshop Journal, no. 56.

Notes

External links

"Dr Hilda Kean on BBC 1: The One Show", Ruskin College, 18 August 2010.

1949 births
Living people
20th-century British historians
21st-century British historians
Academics of Ruskin College
Academics of the University of Greenwich
British animal rights scholars
British animal welfare scholars
Historians of animal rights
Cultural history of the United Kingdom
Academic staff of the University of Technology Sydney